Alfonso Qua is a sailor from Philippines. Qua represented his country at the 1972 Summer Olympics in Kiel. Qua took 26th place in the Soling with Mario Almario as helmsman and Ambrosio Santos as fellow crew member.

References

External links
 

Living people
Filipino male sailors (sport)
Sailors at the 1972 Summer Olympics – Soling
Olympic sailors of the Philippines
Year of birth missing (living people)